The 2021 Senior Bowl was a college football all-star game played on January 30, 2021, at 1:30 p.m. CST, at Hancock Whitney Stadium in Mobile, Alabama. The game featured prospects for the 2021 draft of the professional National Football League (NFL), predominantly from the NCAA Division I Football Bowl Subdivision (FBS), rostered into "National" and "American" teams. It was one of the final 2020–21 bowl games concluding the 2020 FBS football season. Sponsored by Reese's Peanut Butter Cups, the game was officially known as the Reese's Senior Bowl, with television coverage provided by NFL Network.

On January 11, 2021, bowl organizers announced that the teams would be coached by personnel from the Miami Dolphins and Carolina Panthers, coaching the National team and American team, respectively. This was the first Senior Bowl to be played at Hancock Whitney Stadium, after the 1951–2020 editions were held at Ladd–Peebles Stadium, also in Mobile.

Players
Organizers maintained a "watch list" of 250 players as potential invitees. In October 2020, the first invitation was issued to Dillon Radunz, an offensive tackle at North Dakota State of the Football Championship Subdivision (FCS). On January 18, Heisman Trophy winner DeVonta Smith accepted an invitation to the game, but did not play.

Players listed below are all from the NCAA Division I Football Bowl Subdivision (FBS), unless noted otherwise after their college team. A week before the game, the bowl's executive director noted that there were 136 players on-site. In the final week before the game, several players who had accepted invites were replaced on the roster due to injury or other circumstances. Quarterback Kyle Trask was a notable player replaced due to injury.

National team
Full roster online here. Numerical rosters here (a number may be shared by an offensive and defensive player).

Chazz Surratt and Sage Surratt are brothers.

American team
Full roster online here. Numerical rosters here (a number may be shared by an offensive and defensive player).

Game summary
Note special playing rules detailed here. Players in the game were each issued two helmet stickers; one with the player's hometown area code, and one with number 44 for Hank Aaron, who was born in Mobile and died on January 22.

Statistics

Notes

References

Further reading

External links
 Game statistics at statbroadcast.com
 2021 Reese's Senior Bowl via YouTube

Senior Bowl
Senior Bowl
Senior Bowl
Senior Bowl